Michael Sterling Music Group is a record label, based in Miami, Florida. It is owned by Michael Sterling.

Artists
Michael Sterling
Faze
Mr. Mixx
Tessie
Swindle
Trudy
Strawberri Taylor
Supa

References
Official Website
YouTube Website

American record labels
Record labels established in 1990